The AT&T Building is a historic building located at the corner of Pine and Third Streets in Kingman, Arizona. The building was built in 1930 by contractors Mead & Mount. Architects Fisher & Fisher designed the building in the Spanish Colonial Revival style. Built in a residential area, the building is still used by AT&T. The building was placed on the National Register of Historic Places in 1986.

It was evaluated for National Register listing as part of a 1985 study of 63 historic resources in Kingman that led to this and many others being listed.

References

Commercial buildings completed in 1930
Building (Kingman, Arizona)
Spanish Colonial Revival architecture in Arizona
Buildings and structures in Kingman, Arizona
Commercial buildings on the National Register of Historic Places in Arizona
Telecommunications buildings on the National Register of Historic Places
National Register of Historic Places in Kingman, Arizona